The women's 10 metre running target competition at the 2010 Asian Games in Guangzhou, China was held on 15 November at the Aoti Shooting Range.

Schedule
All times are China Standard Time (UTC+08:00)

Records

Results

 Ri Hyang-sim was awarded bronze because of no three-medal sweep per country rule.

References

ISSF Results Overview

External links
Official website

Women RT